The Phil and Penny Knight Campus for Accelerating Scientific Impact (Knight Campus) is a research campus of the University of Oregon that opened in 2020.

About

The 3-acre campus is named after Phil and Penny Knight who provided the lead gift of $500 million over ten years. An endowment will fund the campus's operations, and the campus will not "take dollars away" from other university programs. The three building campus is a billion dollar endeavour and will require additional state and donor support. The campus will be led by an Executive Director who will report directly to the president of the university. One stated goal is to "fast track scientific discoveries ... [and] turning those discoveries into innovations that improve the quality of life for people in Oregon, the nation, and beyond". However, director of the campus will be able to chart out a more robust vision after they are named.

It is hoped that Knight Campus will help grow Oregon's biotechnology sector and generate economic growth for the state. However, professors at other institutions caution that nothing is guaranteed, and that creating a new economic hub from scratch is a tricky process.

Mission

 Science advancing society

Vision

 Dramatically shorten the timeline between discovery and societal impact through world-class research, training and entrepreneurship in a nimble scientific enterprise.

Research

The Knight Campus will initially focus on five research areas: Bioengineering, Materials for Biological Applications, Precision Medicine Technologies, Predicting Complex Biological Systems, and Synthetic Biology/Molecular Engineering

Personnel
The campus forecasts it will have 30 "top-tier" researchers, 150 postdocs, 250 grad students, and 150 undergrads.

Academic programs
The Knight Campus Internship Program will consist of two graduate training programs:

 Master's Industrial Internship Program
Applied Bioinformatics and Genomics Master's Program

Additional programs have yet to be determined.

Facilities

The University of Oregon has hired the firms Bora and Ennead to design the campus' facilities. Initially, the plan was to build three 75,000 square foot buildings at a cost of $100 million each. However, the first phase will consist of a $225 million, 160,000 square foot facility, consisting of two adjoining buildings. An additional building will be built in the future. There is also a proposal to build a fourth building if funding is available.

The campus will be connected to the main campus via pedestrian bridge.

Funding

Phil and Penny Knight have pledged to contribute $500 million over ten years. Additional sources of funding will come from state bonds and philanthropic support. Contrary to media reports the Knight gift is a lead gift and is not contingent on matching funds.

In March 2018, it was announced that the State of Oregon will issue $70 million in bonds to fund the campuses' construction.

In March 2018, it was announced that Lorry Lokey will contribute $10 million towards endowed faculty chairs.

In June 2018, the Robert J. DeArmond Trust made a $10 million gift to endow a research fund for the Robert and Leona DeArmond Executive Director of the Phil and Penny Knight Campus for Accelerating Scientific Impact.

In 2021, the Knights made a second $500 million gift.

References

External links 
 Official website of the Knight Campus

Research institutes in Oregon
University of Oregon